"I'll Supply the Love" is a song written by David Paich and recorded by Toto, with a lead vocal by Bobby Kimball. It was issued on Toto's debut album, Toto, and released as a single in January 1979. It peaked at number 45 on the U.S. Billboard Hot 100, where it spent nine weeks on the chart.

Internationally, the song was a minor hit in both Australia (#92) and Canada (#73), but did best in New Zealand, where it peaked at #29.

Cash Box said it has "power guitar chords, rhythmic changes, impassioned singing and strong chorus."  Billboard said that "David Paich's knack for writing great hooks is evident in this uptempo rocker which features tatsy instrumentation and high vocals." Record World called it a "sterling effort" with "brisk chording and vocals."

Classic Rock History critic Brian Kachejian rated it as Toto's 6th greatest song, calling it a "knockout song."

"I'll Supply the Love" is also featured in the 2011 film Zookeeper.

Toto

Bobby Kimball – lead and backing vocals
Steve Lukather – guitars, backing vocal
Steve Porcaro – synthesizers
David Paich – synthesizers, piano, backing vocal
David Hungate – bass
Jeff Porcaro – drums, percussion

References

1978 songs
1979 singles
Columbia Records singles
Toto (band) songs
Songs written by David Paich